Maxyutovo (Mäqsüt) is a rural locality (a village) in Irgizlinsky Selsoviet, Burzyansky District, Bashkortostan, Russia. The population was 111 as of 2010. There is 1 street.

Geography 
Maxyutovo is located 50 km southwest of Starosubkhangulovo (the district's administrative centre) by road. Kutanovo is the nearest rural locality.

References 

Rural localities in Burzyansky District